Chioma Chukwujindu "CiCi" Onyekwere (born June 28, 1994 in Lansing, Michigan) is an American-born Nigerian track and field athlete specializing in the Discus Throw. She has competed in the shotput and discus throw both on the collegiate level and internationally representing Nigeria and holds the Nigerian National Record for the Discus Throw. Her personal best of 63.30 meters for the Discus Throw was achieved in 2021.

She has won a gold medal for the Discus Throw at the 2022 Commonwealth Games. She has won 3 African Titles over her career, 2 consecutive gold medals at the African Championships (2018 & 2022) and a gold medal at the 2019 African Games. She was recognized for her academic achievement as a student athlete at the University of Maryland for four years by the Big Ten and the ACC while serving as one of the team's captains. Her collegiate honors include All-American recognition, All-Big Ten honors, All-Academic Big Ten, 5 Big Ten Conference Medals, and Solomon Eye Terp of the Week recipient.

Personal 
Born to Chima & Scholar Onyekwere with triplet siblings Chidinma and Chima and older siblings Emeka and Kay. Onyekwere grew up in Nigeria and moved to Fairfax, Virginia in 2002 with her family. She graduated from the A. James Clark School of Engineering at the University of Maryland in Winter 2016 with a Bachelor of Science degree in Mechanical Engineering.

Career

Pre-Collegiate 
Onyekwere attended James W. Robinson High School in Fairfax, VA. She competed under the guidance of former University of Maryland Thrower Beau Fay. Onyekwere was not only District Champion several times but she is also a 2-time district record holder in the shot put. She claimed Regional Champion in 2011 and 2012, 3rd in the state in 2011 & 2012, and placed 5th in Nationals in 2012  .

University of Maryland 
Chioma enrolled at the University of Maryland in the Fall 2012 where she joined the Track and Field team coached by former US Olympian Andrew Valmon.

In 2015, Onyekwere won her first collegiate medal in Maryland's first season in the Big Ten Conference. At the 2015 Big Ten Indoor Track and Field Championships, Onyekwere earned a Silver Medal in the Shotput with her top throw of 16.06 meters (52’ 8.25”). She was awarded 2nd Team All-Big Ten honors for the indoor season. Her shotput dominance carried over into the outdoor season as she earned a Bronze Medal in the Big Ten Outdoor Track & Field Championships with a top mark of 16.10 meters (52’ 10”). She added a Top 10 conference finish at this meet by placing 7th in the Discus throw.

Onyekwere capped off her final Big Ten Indoor Track & Field Championship in 2016 by earning a Silver Medal in the Weight Throw. Her top mark of 21.17 meters (69’ 5.5”) was not only a personal best, but it also broke a school record that had previously stood for 14 years. She placed 6th for the Shotput at this meet as well. Along with earning 2nd Team All-Big Ten honors for the second straight year, her record-breaking throw also qualified her for the 2016 NCAA Division I Indoor Track & Field National Championships. Her performance at this championship was good enough for her to be awarded as a 2nd Team All-American for the 2016 Indoor Season.

Her dominance continued as her final outdoor season went underway. At the UVA Quad Meet in Charlottesville, VA, Onyekwere broke a 34-year school record in the Discus Throw with a toss of 52.4 meters (171’ 11”). She would go on to reset this Discus record at the Big Ten Outdoor Track and Field Championships with a throw of 54.43 meters (178’ 7”). This throw resulted in a Bronze medal. Onyekwere also threw a career-best shotput throw of 16.85 meters (55’ 3.5”) earning a Silver Medal, her 5th Big Ten Medal, and 2nd Team Big-Ten Honors once again. She went on to compete at the NCAA East Regional Championships for both the Shotput and Discus where her 11th place finish in the Shotput qualified her for the NCAA Outdoor T&F Championships. At season’s end, she was awarded as an All-American Honorable Mention for the 2016 Outdoor Season.

Post-Collegiate 
As a member of the Nigerian Senior National Track and Field Team, Onyekwere was selected to compete in the 2016 African Championships in Athletics in Durban, South Africa. She would go on to earn two Bronze Medals at these games. She helped complete a Nigerian-podium sweep by placing 3rd in the Discus with a top throw of 53.91 meters behind teammates Nwanneka Okwelogu and Chinwe Okoro. She also placed 3rd in the Shot put with a top throw of 15.71 meters.

In the 2018 African Championships in Athletics held in Asaba, Nigeria, Onyekwere decided to focus her efforts solely on the Discus throw. This paid off as she put on a show for her home country, earning a Gold Medal the Discus throw with a then personal best throw of 58.09 meters. Onyekwere was invited to represent Team Africa in the 2018 IAAF Continental Cup held in Ostrava, Czech Republic. She finished in 4th place with a top throw of 56.68 meters and had the furthest mark of any African Discus thrower in the competition.

In 2019, she won the Gold Medal at the 2019 African Games in Rabat, Morocco. Her winning throw of 59.91 meters was also the African Games record the event. Onyekwere competed in the 2019 IAAF World Athletics Championship in Doha. She threw a personal best throw of 61.38 meters in the qualifying round and finished in 13th place, one spot shy of advancing to the finals.

In 2021, she broke the Nigerian National Record for the discus throw with throw of 63.30 meters. The previous record of 61.58 meters was set by Chinwe Okoro in 2016.

In 2022, she successfully defended her African Championship winning her 2nd consecutive Gold Medal in the Discus Throw at the 2022 African Championships in Athletics held in Saint Pierre, Mauritius with a top throw of 58.18 meters. After failing to reach the finals of the 2022 World Athletics Championships, she bounced back a couple weeks later at the 2022 Commonwealth Games finishing in first place with a throw of 61.70 meters. This throw was a season's best and helped her earn Nigeria's first ever women's Discus Throw title in the history of the Commonwealth Games.

International competitions 
Note: Only the position and distance in the final are indicated, unless otherwise stated. (q) means the athlete did not qualify for the final, with the overall position and distance in the qualification round indicated.

International Titles 

African Championships in Athletics
 Discus Throw: 2018, 2022
African Games
Discus Throw: 2019
Commonwealth Games
Discus Throw: 2022

References

1994 births
Living people
American sportspeople of Nigerian descent
Sportspeople from Lansing, Michigan
Track and field athletes from Michigan
Maryland Terrapins women's track and field athletes
Nigerian female shot putters
Nigerian female discus throwers
Athletes (track and field) at the 2019 African Games
African Championships in Athletics winners
African Games gold medalists in athletics (track and field)
African Games gold medalists for Nigeria
Commonwealth Games gold medallists for Nigeria
Commonwealth Games medallists in athletics
Athletes (track and field) at the 2022 Commonwealth Games
Medallists at the 2022 Commonwealth Games